Ralph Baker may refer to:

 Ralph Baker (general) (born ), United States Army Major General
 Ralph Baker (halfback) (1902–1977), American  football player
 Ralph Baker (linebacker) (born 1942), American football player
 Ralph Baker Jr. (1945–2008), American broadcaster and actor